Edward Fuller Vincent (December 30, 1881 – October 26, 1940) was an American farmer and politician from New York.

Life
He was born on December 30, 1881, in Washington, D.C., the son of Edgar LaVerne Vincent (1851–1936) and Jennie (Fuller) Vincent (1851–1933). In 1907, he married Lydia C. Corbin, and they had one son. They lived in Maine, Broome County, New York.

Vincent was a member of the New York State Assembly (Broome Co., 1st D.) in 1934, 1935, 1936, 1937, 1938 and 1939–40; and was Chairman of the Committee on Public Institutions from 1937 to 1940.

He died on October 26, 1940, after an illness of several months; and was buried at the Floral Park Cemetery in Johnson City.

Sources

External links
 

1881 births
1940 deaths
People from Broome County, New York
People from Washington, D.C.
Republican Party members of the New York State Assembly
20th-century American politicians